Ahu Vinapu is an archaeological site on Rapa Nui (Easter Island) in Eastern Polynesia.

The ceremonial center of Vinapu includes one of the larger ahu on Rapa Nui. The ahu exhibits extraordinary stonemasonry consisting of large, carefully fitted slabs of basalt. The American archaeologist, William Mulloy investigated the site in 1958.

Thor Heyerdahl believed that the accurately fitted stonework showed contact with Peru, especially in comparison to the stone walls of Sacsayhuaman. The stone wall faces towards sunrise at Winter Solstice.

Vinapu is part of the Rapa Nui National Park, which UNESCO has declared a World Heritage Site.

References 

Bibliography
 Mulloy, W.T. 1959. The Ceremonial Center of Vinapu. Actas del XXXIII Congreso Internacional de Americanistas. San José, Costa Rica.
 Norwegian Archaeological Expedition to Easter Island and the East Pacific, T. Heyerdahl, E.N. Ferdon, W.T. Mulloy, A. Skjølsvold, C.S. Smith. 1961. Archaeology of Easter Island. Stockholm; Santa Fe, N.M.: Forum Pub. House; distributed by The School of American Research.

External links 

 William Mulloy Library 
 Father Sebastian Englert Anthropology Museum
 Easter Island Foundation
 Rapa Nui Fact Sheet with Photographs
 Nova: The Secrets of Easter Island

Easter Island ahu
Archaeological sites in Easter Island
Archaeological sites in Chile
Polygonal masonry